Music For Nations (MFN) is a British independent record label focusing mainly on rock and metal. It was a subsidiary of the larger label distributor Zomba Records, which was a division of BMG and later Sony Music Entertainment.

Launched in 1983 by Martin Hooker, Music For Nations established itself as a European leader in the rock and metal world, with early signings like Tank, Exciter, Metallica (who had three gold albums while on MFN), Slayer and Megadeth paving the way. As MFN grew, the company expanded its operation to include not just licensed acts from the United States, but its own signings. It released albums by artists including Paradise Lost, Opeth, Anathema, Cradle of Filth, Testament and countless other metal bands.  As well as the traditional metal bands MFN went on to sign up and coming UK bands such as Tigertailz who had a top 40 album while signed to Music For Nations.

In 2004, the label closed down. The company's catalogue — which had also previously included titles from artists as varied as Lost Horizon, Tigertailz and Frank Zappa — was transferred to parent company Zomba Records Group. In December 2011, The End Records signed a distribution deal for 50 of MFN's catalog albums.

In February 2015, MFN relaunched through Sony's commercial department, with plans to reissue albums from their catalogue including Anathema, Paradise Lost, Opeth, Spiritual Beggars, Cradle of Filth and others. They also intend to, in the spirit of the label's original purpose, sign original heavy talent for singles, EPs and compilation albums.

In October 2017, MFN signed two newcomers, metalcore band Bury Tomorrow and ambient rock band Blanket. In June 2018, American metalcore band Killswitch Engage joined MFN's UK roster; the band's forthcoming album will be marketed by Metal Blade Records in the United States, and internationally through Columbia/Sony.

Roster 

 Acid Drinkers (1990–1992) (Subsidiary label – Under One Flag)
 Agent Steel
 Alaska
 Amplifier
 Anathema
 Anthem
 Anthrax
 Apes, Pigs & Spacemen
 Apocalypse
 Astroid Boys (Subsidiary label – Under One Flag)
 Baby Tuckoo
 Battleaxe
 Bury Tomorrow
 The Beyond
 Candlemass
 Chrome Molly
 Cradle of Filth
 Creation of Death (1991–1992) (Subsidiary label – Under One Flag)
 Darkmoon
 Dispatched
 Dead Potatoes (2003–2006)
 Dearly Beheaded (1995–1998)
 Dragon (1990–1991) (Subsidiary label – Under One Flag)
 Drive She Said
 Earthshaker
 Entombed
 Exciter
 Exodus
 The Exploited (Subsidiary label – Rough Justice)
 Freak of Nature
 Godflesh
 Hed PE
 Hellion
 Helstar
 Hot Milk
 InMe
 Killswitch Engage
 Juster
 Legs Diamond
 Lost Horizon
 Loudness
 Lowfive
 Manowar
 Eric Martin
 Meanstreak
 Megadeth
 Mercyful Fate
 Metallica
 Mike Tramp
 Milk Teeth
 Mindfunk
 Nightshade
 Nuclear Assault
 Onslaught
 Opeth
 Paradise Lost
 Simon Phillips
 Porcupine Tree (2021-present)
 Q5
 Ratt
 Rio
 The Rods
 Rogue Male
 Rox
 Sarcófago (1985–1986)
 Savatage
 Sirrah (1995–1999)
 Spiritual Beggars
 Jack Starr
 SugarComa (2001–2003)
 Sugarcreek
 Suicide Squad
 Surgin
 Tank
 Testament
 Thrasher
 Tigertailz (1990–2005)
 TKO
 Tyketto
 Turbo (1990–1991) (Subsidiary label – Under One Flag)
 Robin Trower
 Twelfth Night
 Tygers of Pan Tang
 Venom (1989–1992) (Subsidiary label – Under One Flag)
 Virgin Steele
 W.A.S.P.
 Wolf Spider (1990–1991) (Subsidiary label – Under One Flag)
 Waysted
 Wendy O. Williams
 XisLoaded

See also 
List of record labels

References

External links 
Official website
Music For Nations at Discogs.com

British record labels
Record labels established in 1983
Record labels disestablished in 2004
Record labels established in 2015
Re-established companies
Rock record labels
Heavy metal record labels
Zomba Group of Companies subsidiaries
1983 establishments in the United Kingdom